Winter in Union Square is a late 19th-century painting by American artist Childe Hassam. Done in oil on canvas, the painting depicts Union Square in New York City during a winter snowstorm. The painting is in the collection of the Metropolitan Museum of Art.

Description
The work was painted by Hassam from a vantage point on 17th Street, looking out over Union Square. The painting is done in Hassam's signature form of impressionism, and covers one of his favorite subjects; normally-crowded hubs of activity during the wintertime.

References

1889 paintings
Paintings in the collection of the Metropolitan Museum of Art
Paintings by Childe Hassam